The list of ironclads includes all steam-propelled warship (supplemented with sails in various cases) and protected by iron or steel armor plates that were built in the early part of the second half of the 19th century, between 1859 and the early 1890s. The list is arranged alphabetically by country. The initial dates of the boats correspond to the launch time, followed by a separation that indicates their retirement or final date.

The list includes ironclads of two different categories or roles, oceanic and coastal (the latter may be floating batteries, monitors and coastal defence ships). The various ironclads design such as the ram, broadside, central battery (or casemate), turret and barbette will be mentioned. Some of these ocean ironclads can be classified as armored frigates, armored corvettes, or others based on their displacement. Wooden hull ships that have been subsequently armored will also be considered in this list.

Although the introduction of the ironclad is clear-cut, the boundary between 'ironclad' and the later 'pre-dreadnought battleship' is less obvious, as the characteristics of the pre-dreadnought evolved from 1875 to 1895. For the sake of this article, a line is drawn around 1890, differing from country to country.

Americas

Argentina

 Monitors
  
  (1874) - retired in 1927
  (1875) - retired in 1928
 Central battery ironclad
  (1880) - retired in 1932
 Coastal defence ships
 
  (1891) - retired in 1946 
  (1892) - retired in 1946

Brazil
 Central battery ironclads (or casemate)
  (1864) - retired in 1879
  (1865) - retired in 1879
  (1865) - retired in 1882
  (1866) - sunk by floating mines ('torpedoes') in the River Paraguay in 1866, during Paraguayan War
 
  (1865) - stricken in 1897
  (1865) - stricken in 1885
 
  (1866) - stricken in 1885
  (1866) - stricken in 1885
  (1874) - sunk after fire, during Fleet Revolt of 1893–94

 Monitors
  (1865) - struck in 1894
 
  (1867) - discarded in 1884 
  (1867) - scrapped in 1907
  (1867) - scrapped in 1900
  (1868) - scrapped in 1893
  (1868) - scrapped in 1884
  (1868) - sank in 1882 at her moorings due to the poor condition of her hull
 
  (1874) - sunk in Battle on 22 November 1893, during Fleet Revolt of 1893–94
  (1875) - it was wrecked in 1892 near the Cabo Polonio lighthouse in Uruguay
 Ironclads turret ship
  (1865) - struck in 1894
  (1865) - struck in 1880
  (1883) - retired in 1910
  (1885) - sank after an explosion during a routine cruise in 1906

Chile

 Central battery armored frigates  
 
  (1874) - alienated in 1933
  (1875) - sunk in 1891 in the Battle of Caldera Bay, during Chilean Civil War of 1891
 Ironclad turret ship
 * (1865, ex Peruvian ship) - captured in the Battle of Angamos in 1879 during War of the Pacific, retired in 1896 and turned into a historical relic in 1934

Haiti
 Casemate ironclad
 Triumph (1861, ex British merchant Fingal and then ) - lost at sea in 1869 shortly after the purchase

Peru
 Monitors    
  (1864) - unknown ending
 
 Atahualpa (1864, ex ) - acquired in 1868 and sunk in the Blockade of Callao in 1881, during War of the Pacific
 Manco Cápac (1864, ex ) - acquired in 1868 and sunk in the Battle of Arica in 1880, during War of the Pacific
 Broadside armored frigate
  (1865) - ran aground in the Battle of Punta Gruesa in 1879, during War of the Pacific
 Ironclad turret ship
 Huáscar* (1865) - captured by the Chileans at the Battle of Angamos in 1879, during War of the Pacific
 Casemate ironclad
  (1854/1865) - sunk in the Blockade of Callao in 1881, during War of the Pacific

United States

Asia

China
 Coastal defence ships
  (after 1875) - unknown
  (1890) - captured by the Japanese in 1895 after Battle of Weihaiwei, during First Sino-Japanese War
 Ironclads turret ship
 
  (1881) - sunk in 1895 in the Battle of Weihaiwei, during First Sino-Japanese War
  (1882) - captured by the Japanese in 1895 after the Battle of Weihaiwei, during First Sino-Japanese War

Japan

 Ironclad ram
 Kōtetsu* (1864, as CSS Stonewall) - acquired from the United States in 1869 and retired in 1888
 Armoured corvettes
  (1869) - retired in 1906
 
  (1877) - retired in 1909
  (1877) - retired in 1911
 Central battery ironclad
  (1877) - sold for scrap in 1909
 Ironclad turret ship 
  (1882, ex Chinese ship Zhenyuan) - captured in 1895 during First Sino-Japanese War and retired in 1911
 Coastal defence ship 
  (1890, ex Chinese ship Pingyuan) - captured in 1895 during First Sino-Japanese War and sunk by adverse weather causes during Russo-Japanese War

Ottoman Empire

Siam
 Floating battery
 Siam Mongkut (1870) - probably discarded 1912

Europe

Austria-Hungary

Denmark

 Broadside armored frigates  
  (1864) - scrapped 1907
  (1850/1864) - retired in 1897
  (1864) - scrapped 1897
 Ironclad turret ship
  (1863) - scrapped 1907
 Ironclad ram
 Stærkodder (1864, as CSS Stonewall) - the Danish purchase in 1864 of this ship failed and ended up being sold to Japan in 1867 and renamed *
 Monitors
  (1868) - retired in 1907
  (1870) - retired in 1912
 Casemate ironclad
  (1872) - retired in 1912
 Barbette ironclads
  (1878) - retired in 1907
  (1880) - retired in 1908
  (1886) - retired in 1919

France

Germany

Greece

 Central battery armored corvette
  (1867) - scrapped in 1915
 Broadside armored corvette 
  (1869) - scrapped in 1925
 Barbette ironclads
 
  (1889) - retired in 1919  
  (1889) - retired in 1929 
  (1890) - sold for scrap in 1932

Italy

Netherlands

 Casemate ironclad
  (1853/1863) - unknown
 Ironclads turret ship
  (1866) - scrapped after 1905
  (1874) - scuttled in 1942, during World War II
 Monitors
 
  (1868) - retired in 1973 and converted into a museum ship in 1974
  (1870) - sold for scrap in 1897
 
  (1868) - converted into a museum ship in 1982
  (1868) - struck in 1908
 
  (1868) - sold for scrapping in 1910
  (1868) - unknown
  (1868) - unknown
 
  (1869) - unknown
  (1869) - unknown
 
  (1870) - unknown
  (1870) - unknown
  (1871) - unknown
  (1871) - unknown
  (1871) - unknown
  (1876) - unknown
  (1877) - unknown
  (1878) - unknown
  (1891) - unknown

Norway
 Monitors
 
  (1866) - scrapped in 1908
  (1869) - scrapped in 1918
 
  (1868) - scrapped in 1909
  (1872) - wrecked in 1919

Portugal
 Central battery ironclad
  (1876) - broken up in 1935

Russia

Spain

 Broadside armored frigates
  (1863) - sunk by accident or sabotage in the siege of Cartagena in 1873, during Cantonal rebellion
  (1863) - retired in 1912
  (1864) - scrapped in 1883
  (1865) - retired in 1911
 Central battery armored frigates
  (1867) - stricken in 1896
  (1869) - retired in 1896
  (1861/1870) - scrapped in 1896
 Floating battery
  (1874) - retired in 1900
 Monitor
  (1874) - retired in 1900
 Barbette ironclad
  (1887) - scrapped in 1925

Swedish

 Monitors
 
  (1865) - sold in 1919
  (1865) - sold in 1922
  (1866) - sold for scrap in 1922
  (1869) - scrapped in 1908
  (1867) - sold for scrap in 1893
  (1868) - sunk as a target in 1907
  (1872) - retired in 1903
 
  (1872) - sold in 1919
  (1872) - retired in 1919
  (1873) - sold in 1919
  (1874) - sold in 1919
  (1874) - sold in 1919
  (1875) - sold in 1919
  (1875) - decommissioned in 1919
 Coastal defence ships
 
  (1885) - retired in 1941
  (1889) - retired in 1923
  (1893) - retired in 1923

United Kingdom

See also 

 List of battleships
 List of cruisers
 List of battlecruisers

Notes

References

Bibliography
 

ironclads